The region that is today the U.S. State of Colorado has been inhabited by Native Americans and their Paleoamerican ancestors for at least 13,500 years and possibly more than 37,000 years. The eastern edge of the Rocky Mountains was a major migration route that was important to the spread of early peoples throughout the Americas. The Lindenmeier site in Larimer County contains artifacts dating from approximately 8720 BCE.

When explorers, early trappers, hunters, and gold miners visited and settled in Colorado, the state was populated by American Indian nations. Westward expansion brought European settlers to the area and Colorado's recorded history began with treaties and wars with Mexico and American Indian nations to gain territorial lands to support the transcontinental migration. In the early days of the Colorado gold rush, Colorado was a Territory of Kansas and Territory of Jefferson. On August 1, 1876, Colorado was admitted as a state, maintaining its territorial borders.

Historic Native American people

Ancestral Puebloans — A diverse group of peoples that lived in the valleys and mesas of the Colorado Plateau
Apache Nation — An Athabaskan-speaking nation that lived in the Great Plains in the 18th century, then migrated southward to Texas, New Mexico, and Arizona, leaving a void on the plains that was filled by the Arapaho and Cheyenne from the east.
Arapaho Nation — An Algonquian-speaking nation that migrated westward to the base of the Rocky Mountains in the late 19th century and settled on the piedmont and the eastern plains. They were relocated entirely out of Colorado in 1865 following the Colorado War.
Cheyenne Nation — An Algonquian-speaking nation very closely related to the Arapaho. Like the Arapaho, they migrated westward in the 18th century to the base of the Rockies. They often lived in bands interspersed among the Arapaho, and were also relocated out of Colorado in the 1860s.
Comanche Nation — A Numic-speaking nation that lived on the High Plains of southeastern Colorado. Closely related to the Shoshone, they acquired the horse from the Spaniards and roamed the southern Great Plains. The Comanche were removed to Indian territory.
Shoshone Nation — A Numic-speaking nation that inhabited intermountain valleys along the north edge of the state, especially in the Yampa River valley, up through the late 19th century. Areas included North Park and Browns Park.
Ute Nation — A Numic-speaking nation that has lived in the Southern and the Western Rocky Mountains for many centuries. Their leaders were Chief Ouray and his wife Chipeta. They often clashed with the Arapaho and Cheyenne, and resisted the encroachment of these nations into the mountains. Until the 1880s, the Ute controlled nearly all of Colorado west of the continental divide, a situation that eroded after the silver boom of 1879. After clashing with white settlers in the 1880s in the Meeker Massacre, they were nearly entirely relocated out of the state into Utah, except for two small reservations in southwestern Colorado.

European settlement

The first Europeans to visit the region were Spanish conquistadors. Juan de Oñate who lived until 1626, founded what would become the Spanish province of Santa Fé de Nuevo México among the pueblos of the Rio Grande on July 11, 1598. In 1787 Juan Bautista de Anza established the settlement of San Carlos near present-day Pueblo, Colorado, but it quickly failed. This was the only Spanish attempt to create a settlement north of the Arkansas River. Colorado became part of the Spanish province of Santa Fe de Nuevo México as part of the Viceroyalty of New Spain. The Spaniards traded with Native Americans who lived there and established the Comercio Comanchero (Comanche Trade) among the Spanish settlements and the Native Americans.

In 1803 the United States acquired a territorial claim to the eastern flank of the Rocky Mountains by the Louisiana Purchase from France. However, the claim conflicted with Spain's claim to sovereignty over the territory. Zebulon Pike led a U.S. Army reconnaissance expedition into the disputed region in 1806. Pike and his troops were arrested by Spanish cavalry in the San Luis Valley, taken to Chihuahua, then expelled from México.

Miguel Hidalgo y Costilla declared Mexico's independence from Spain on September 16, 1810. In 1819, the United States ceded its claim to the land south and west of the Arkansas River to Spain with the Adams-Onís Treaty, at the same time purchasing Florida. Mexico finally won its independence with the Treaty of Córdoba signed on August 24, 1821, and assumed the territorial claims of Spain. Although Mexican traders ventured north, settlers stayed south of the 37th parallel north until the United States signed a peace treaty with the Ute Nation in 1850.

During the period 1832 to 1856, traders, trappers, and settlers established trading posts and small settlements along the Arkansas River, and on the South Platte near the Front Range. Prominent among these were Bent's Fort and Fort Pueblo on the Arkansas and Fort Saint Vrain on the South Platte. The main item of trade offered by the Indians was buffalo robes, see Early history of the Arkansas Valley in Colorado and Forts in Colorado.

In 1846 the United States went to war with Mexico. Mexico's defeat forced the nation to relinquish its northern territories by the Treaty of Guadalupe Hidalgo in 1848. This opened the Southern Rocky Mountains to American settlement, including what is now the lower portion of Colorado. The newly gained land was divided into the Territory of New Mexico and the Territory of Utah, both organized in 1850, and the Territory of Kansas and the Territory of Nebraska, organized in 1854. Most settlers avoided the rugged Rocky Mountains and headed for Oregon, the Deseret, or California, usually following the North Platte River and the Sweetwater River to South Pass in what is now Wyoming.

On April 9, 1851, Hispanic settlers from Taos, New Mexico, settled the village of San Luis, then in the New Mexico Territory, but now Colorado's first permanent European settlement.

Pike's Peak Gold Rush

On June 22, 1850, a wagon train bound for California crossed the South Platte River just north of the confluence with Clear Creek, and followed Clear Creek west for six miles. Lewis Ralston dipped his gold pan in a stream flowing into Clear Creek, and found almost $5 in gold (about a quarter of a troy ounce) in his first pan. John Lowery Brown, who kept a diary of the party's journey from Georgia to California, wrote on that day: "Lay bye. Gold found." In a notation above the entry, he wrote, "We called this Ralston's Creek because a man of that name found gold here.”

Ralston continued on to California, but returned to 'Ralston's Creek' with the Green Russell party eight years later. Members of this party founded Auraria (later absorbed into Denver City) in 1858 and touched off the gold rush to the Rockies. The confluence of Clear Creek and Ralston Creek, the site of Colorado's first gold discovery is now in Arvada, Colorado.

In 1858, several parties of gold seekers bound for the California Gold Rush panned small amounts of gold from various streams in the South Platte River Valley at the foot of the Rocky Mountains in then western Kansas Territory, now northeast Colorado. The gold nuggets initially failed to impress the gold seekers, but rumors of gold in the Rocky Mountains persisted, and several small parties explored the region.

The following year, William Greeneberry "Green" Russell led a party of Cherokee gold seekers from the State of Georgia to search for gold along the South Platte River. In the first week of July 1857, Green Russell and Sam Bates found a small placer deposit near the mouth of Little Dry Creek (in present-day Englewood) that yielded about 20 troy ounces (622 grams) of gold, the first significant gold discovery in the Rocky Mountain region.

News of this discovery soon spread and precipitated the Pike's Peak Gold Rush. An estimated 100,000 gold seekers flocked to the region over the next three years. The placer gold deposits along the rivers and streams of the region rapidly played out, but miners soon discovered far more valuable seams of hard rock gold, silver, and other minerals in the nearby mountains. This gold rush helped to attract people to the state and resulted in a population boom.

Territory of Jefferson

The Provisional Government of the Territory of Jefferson was organized on October 24, 1859, but the new territory failed to secure federal sanction. The Provisional Government freely administered the region despite its lack of official status until the U.S. Territory of Colorado was organized in 1861.

Territory of Colorado

The Territory of Colorado was a historic, organized territory of the United States that existed between 1861 and 1876. Its boundaries were identical to the current State of Colorado. The territory ceased to exist when Colorado was admitted to the Union as a state on August 1, 1876. The territory was organized in the wake of the 1859 Pike's Peak Gold Rush, which had brought the first large concentration of white settlement to the region. The organic act creating the territory was passed by Congress and signed by President James Buchanan on February 28, 1861, during the secessions by Southern states that precipitated the American Civil War. The organization of the territory helped solidify Union control over a mineral rich area of the Rocky Mountains.

Statehood was regarded as fairly imminent, as during the run-up to the 1864 presidential election the Republican–controlled Congress was actually eager to get two more Republican senators and three more electoral votes for President Lincoln's re-election bid. Territorial Governor John Evans persuaded Congress to adopt an enabling act, but a majority of the 6,192 Coloradoans who voted, in a population of around 35,000, turned down the first attempt at a state constitution and the second attempt at statehood. Later, at the end of 1865, territorial ambitions for statehood were thwarted again, this time by a veto by President Andrew Johnson. Statehood for the territory was a recurring issue during the Ulysses Grant administration, with Grant advocating statehood against a less willing Congress during Reconstruction.

Colorado War

The Colorado War (1863–1865) was an armed conflict between the United States and a loose alliance among the Kiowa, Comanche, Arapaho, and Cheyenne nations of Native Americans (the last two were particularly closely allied). The war was centered on the Eastern Plains of the Colorado Territory and resulted in the removal of these four Native American peoples from present-day Colorado to present-day Oklahoma. The war included a particularly notorious episode in November 1864 known as the Sand Creek Massacre. The battle, initially hailed by the U.S. press as a great victory, was later learned to be one of genocidal brutality. The resulting hearings in the United States Congress regarding the malfeasance of the U.S. Army commander, John Chivington, were a watershed in the white views of the Indian Wars at the close of the American Civil War. In 1868 the U.S. Army, led by George Armstrong Custer, renewed the conflict against the Arapaho and Cheyenne at the Battle of Washita River.

Statehood

The United States Congress passed an enabling act on March 3, 1875, specifying the requirements for the Territory of Colorado to become a state. On August 1, 1876 (28 days after the Centennial of the United States), U.S. President Ulysses S. Grant signed a proclamation admitting the state of Colorado to the Union as the 38th state and earning it the moniker "Centennial State". The borders of the new state coincided with the borders established for the Colorado Territory.

Women won the right to vote in Colorado via referendum on November 7, 1893. Colorado was the first state in the union to grant universal suffrage through a popular vote. (Wyoming approved the right of women to vote in 1869 through a vote of the territorial legislature.)

Governor Davis H. Waite campaigned for the Constitutional amendment granting women the right to vote in Colorado. Governor Waite is also noted as one of the few elected officials ever to call out the state militia to protect miners from a force raised by mine owners. Governor Waite belonged to the Populist Party.

Mining in Colorado
 
Participants in the Pike's Peak Gold Rush from 1858 to 1861 were called Fifty-Niners and many of the new arrivals settled in the Denver area. Gold in paying quantities was also discovered in the Central City area. In 1879, silver was discovered in Leadville, resulting in the Colorado Silver Boom.

Many early mining efforts were cooperative ventures. However, as easy-to-reach surface deposits played out, miners increasingly turned to hard rock mining. Such industrial operations required greater capital, and the economic concept of mineral rights resulted in periodic conflicts between the mine owners, and the miners who increasingly sold their labor to work in the mines.

As the mines were dug deeper, they became more dangerous, and the work more arduous, creating the conditions for conflict. In 1880, Colorado Governor Pitkin, a Republican, declared martial law to suppress a violent mining strike at Leadville. In the 1890s many Colorado miners began to form unions in order to protect themselves. The mine operators often formed mine owners' associations in response, setting up the conditions for a conflict. Notable labor disputes between hard rock miners and the mine operators included the Cripple Creek strike of 1894 and the Colorado Labor Wars of 1903–04.

Coal mining in Colorado began soon after the first settlers arrived. Although the discovery of coal did not cause boom cycles as did the precious metals, the early coal mining industry also established the conditions for violent confrontations between miners and mine owners. The usual issues were wages, hours, and working conditions, but miners were also concerned about issues of fairness, and company control over their personal lives.

Early coal mining in Colorado was extremely dangerous, and the state had one of the highest death rates in the nation. During the three decades from 1884 to 1914, more than 1,700 workers died in Colorado's coal mines. Coal miners also resented having to pay for safety work such as timbering the mines, and they were sometimes paid in scrip that had value only in the company store, with the cost of goods set by the company.

The Colorado Coalfield War, centered around the 1913-1914 United Mine Workers of America strike against the Rockefeller-owned Colorado Fuel and Iron company, saw dozens die in battles on the Southern Colorado coalfields. The Ludlow Massacre became the peak of the violence, when Colorado National Guard and militia fired into a tent colony of strikers, in which many children were killed. The violence would continue until Woodrow Wilson sent federal soldiers to disarm both sides.

Another coal strike in 1927 is best known for Colorado's first Columbine massacre. In 1933, federal legislation for the first time allowed all Colorado coal miners to join unions without fear of retaliation by instituting penalties for mine owners who obstructed collective bargaining.

Like all resource extraction, mining is a boom or bust industry, and over the years many small towns were established, then abandoned when the ore ran out, the market collapsed, or another resource became available. There were once more than a hundred coal mines in the area north of Denver and east of Boulder. The mines began to close when natural gas lines arrived. Coal and precious metals are still mined in Colorado, but the mining industries have changed dramatically in recent decades.

Reports of the revival of molybdenum mining in 2007 resulted in ambivalent responses with Leadville welcoming the opening of the mine at Climax,<ref>"Freeport-McMoRan Copper & Gold Inc. Announces Plans to Restart Climax Molybdenum Mine"  Press release 'by Freeport-McMoRan Copper & Gold Inc. December 4, 2007</ref> but strong opposition in Crested Butte over proposed operations at Mount Emmons. Opinion in Rico, site of the Silver Creek stockwork Molybdenum deposit is more divided. There, land slated for development is being bought up by a mining company.

Today there are many small mining towns scattered throughout Colorado, such as Leadville, Georgetown, Cripple Creek, Victor, and Central City. Although many of the mines no longer operate, the remnants of the operations can be seen in the form of mine shafts, outbuildings, and mounds of rock extracted from the hills. Many former mining towns turned to gambling to draw visitors, with Blackhawk and Cripple Creek serving as good examples. The 19th century ended with a difficult law-and-order situation in some places, most notably, Creede, Colorado, where gunmen like Robert Ford (the assassin of Jesse James) and con artist like Soapy Smith reigned.

"The World's Sanitarium"
Starting in the 1860s, when tuberculosis (TB) was a major deadly disease, physicians in the eastern United States recommended that their patients relocate to sunny, dry climates for their lungs. As a result, the number of people with tuberculosis, called "lungers", in the state grew alarmingly and without the services or facilities to support their needs. Not knowing how to manage a population of homeless, ill people, many were taken to jail. Because of the number of people with TB and their families who came to Denver for their health, by the 1880s it was nicknamed the "World's Sanitarium". Cynthia Stout, a history scholar, asserted that by 1900 "one-third of Colorado's population were residents of the state because of tuberculosis."Varnell, pp. 39-40.

Twentieth century

In the early 1920s, the Ku Klux Klan was an important political force in Colorado, but it was unable to get any of its proposals enacted into law, and it died out by 1930.

The 1930s saw the beginning of the ski industry in Colorado. Resorts were established in areas such as Estes Park, Gunnison, and on Loveland Pass. During WWII, the 10th Mountain Division established Camp Hale to train elite ski troops.

In the 1940s, the Republican governor of Colorado, Ralph Carr, spoke out against racial discrimination and against the federal internment of Japanese-Americans during World War II.

In 1967, Governor John A. Love signed the nation's first liberalized abortion law. The late 1960s saw violence in Denver, in the form of race riots, and college buildings being burned by radicals. The Family Dog Denver music venue opened that year, ushering in the hippie movement in the state, to the great consternation of city and state leaders and parents, leading to several municipal and federal court cases. It also made Colorado a major music destination thereafter. 

In 1972, Colorado became the only state to reject the award of hosting the Olympic Games after they had been granted. When Representative Lamm led a successful movement to reject a bond issue for expenses related to hosting the event, the International Olympic Committee relocated the 1976 Winter Olympics to Innsbruck, Austria. No venue had rejected the award before nor has any venue since.

In 1999, the Columbine High School massacre became the most devastating high-school massacre in United States history until the Marjory Stoneman Douglas High School Shooting in 2018.

Twenty-first century
On July 20, 2012, not far from the location of the aforementioned massacre at Columbine High School, 12 people were killed and 70 people were injured in the 2012 Aurora, Colorado shooting, when James Eagan Holmes, a former neuroscience doctoral student, walked into an Aurora, Colorado Cinemark movie theater with multiple firearms, and started shooting at random at people trying to escape during a midnight Thursday showing of The Dark Knight Rises, killing 12 people and injuring 70 others. It was the deadliest shooting in Colorado since the Columbine High School massacre and, in terms of both the dead and wounded in the number of casualties, was the largest single mass shooting in U.S. history.

Colorado is now 1 of 15 states that have legalized both medical and recreational marijuana, allowing them to tax the product. As of July 2014, six months after recreational shops began sales of marijuana in Colorado, the state has enjoyed a tax revenue of 45 million with 98 million expected by the end of the calendar year. This is in addition to increased economic revenues from "pot tourists."

As of July 9, 2020, the COVID-19 pandemic has affected over 35,000 people in Colorado and killed 1,544.

As of August 2022, over 1.6 million cases of COVID-19 had been reported in Colorado with over 13,000 deaths.

See also

History
Colorado Silver BoomColorado 1870-2000Cuerno Verde
Forts in Colorado
Governor of Colorado
History Colorado (previously the Colorado Historical Society)
History of Denver, Colorado
History of the Colorado Plateau
History of the Great Plains
History of the Rocky Mountains
Indigenous peoples of the North American Southwest
List of cities and towns in Colorado
List of counties in Colorado
List of ghost towns in Colorado
List of territorial claims and designations in Colorado
Pike's Peak Gold Rush
Prehistory of Colorado
Women's suffrage in Colorado
Outline of Colorado prehistory
Southwestern archaeology
Santa Fe de Nuevo México
La Louisiane
La Luisiana
District of Louisiana
Territory of Louisiana
Territory of Missouri
State of Deseret
Territory of New Mexico
Territory of Utah
Territory of Kansas
Territory of Nebraska
Territory of Jefferson
Territory of Colorado
State of Colorado
Timeline of Colorado history
:Category:History of Colorado
commons:Category:History of Colorado

Colorado
Colorado counties
Colorado municipalities
Constitution of Colorado
Index of Colorado-related articles
List of counties in Colorado
List of governors of Colorado
List of lieutenant governors of Colorado
Outline of Colorado
U.S. congressional delegations from Colorado

References

Further reading
Abbott, Carl, et al. Colorado: A History of the Centennial State, 2005, textbook; 553 pages, 
 Athearn, Robert G. Rebel of the Rockies: A History of the Denver and Rio Grande Western Railroad. 1962.
 Baker, James H., and Leroy R. Hafen, eds. History of Colorado. 5 vol State Historical Society of Colorado, 1927, with many short biographical sketches
 Bancroft, Hubert Howe, History of Nevada, Colorado, and Wyoming, 1540-1888 (1890) 828 pages; famous classic; online edition
 Berwanger, Eugene W. The Rise of the Centennial State: Colorado Territory, 1861–76, (2007) 208 pages
 Cassels, E. Steve. The Archeology of Colorado. Boulder: Johnson Books, 1983
 Cronin, Thomas E. and Robert D. Loevy. Colorado Politics & Government: Governing the Centennial State, (1993) online edition
 Ellis, Elmer. Henry Moore Teller: Defender of the West. 1941.
 Ellis, Richard N., and Duane A. Smith. Colorado: A History in Photographs. 1991.
 Gulliford, Andrew. Boomtown Blues: Colorado Oil Shale, 1885-1985. 1989.
 Hafen, Le Roy R. Colorado: The Story of a Western Commonwealth.  1933.
 Hogan, Richard. Class and Community in Frontier Colorado. 1990.
 Lamm, Richard D., and Duane A. Smith. Pioneers and Politicians: 10 Colorado Governors in Profile. 1981. popular
 Lecompte, Janet. Pueblo, Hardscrabble, Greenhorn: The Upper Arkansas, 1832-1856, University of Oklahoma Press, 1977, hardcover, 354 pages, 
 Lorch, Robert S. Colorado's Government. 5th ed. 1991. textbook
 Ormes, Robert M. Guide to the Colorado Mountains. 7th ed. 1979.
 Parsons, Eugene. The Making of Colorado: A Historical Sketch (1908) 324 pages  online edition
 Philpott, William. Vacationland: Tourism and Environment in the Colorado High Country (University of Washington Press; 2013) 488 pages; the post 1945 transformation of a once isolated and little-visited region into a major ski and tourist destination
 Rohrbough, Malcolm J. Aspen: The History of a Silver Mining Town, 1879-1893. 1986. scholarly study
 Scamehorn, Lee. High Altitude Energy: A History of Fossil Fuels in Colorado (2002) online edition
 Scamehorn, Lee. Mill & Mine: The Cf&I in the Twentieth Century (1992)  online edition
 Schulte, Steven C.  Wayne Aspinall and the Shaping of the American West (2002) online edition
 Schulten, Susan. "The Civil War and the Origins of the Colorado Territory," Western Historical Quarterly  (Spring 2013) 44#1 pp 21–46.
 Smith, Duane A. The Trail of Gold and Silver: Mining in Colorado, 1859–2009 (Boulder: University Press of Colorado, 2009. xiv, 282 pp.) 
 Smith, Duane A.  Henry M. Teller: Colorado's Grand Old Man, 2002 online edition
 Sprague, Marshall. Money Mountain: The Story of Cripple Creek Gold (1979) online edition
 Ubbelohde, Carl, Maxine Benson, and Duane Smith. A Colorado History. 6th ed. 1988. textbook
 Varnell, Jeanne. Women of Consequence: The Colorado Women's Hall of Fame, Johnson Press, Boulder, 1999, .
 Wiatrowski, Claude. Railroads of Colorado: Your Guide to Colorado's Historic Trains and Railway Sites, Voyageur Press, 2002, hardcover, 160 pages, 
Wickens, James F. "The Depression and New Deal in Colorado," in John Braeman et al. eds. The New Deal: Volume Two - the State and Local Levels (1975) pp 269–310
 Wright, James Edward. The Politics of Populism: Dissent in Colorado. 1974. on 1890s
 

Primary sources
 Ubbelohde, Carl, ed. A Colorado Reader (2nd ed 1964)
 Fossett, Frank.  Colorado: A Historical, Descriptive and Statistical Work on the Rocky Mountain Gold and Silver Mining Region (1878) 470 pages  online edition
 Fossett, Frank.  Colorado, Its Gold and Silver Mines: Farms and Stock Ranges, and Health and Pleasure Resorts (1880),  online edition
 Parsons, Eugene. A Guidebook to Colorado'' (1911) 390 pages  online edition

External links

State of Colorado website
History Colorado website

 
Colorado
Colorado Territory
Colorado
History of the Rocky Mountains